The Blackledge-Gair House at 111 Madison Avenue between Brookside Avenue and Waverly Place in Cresskill, New Jersey is one of the Early Stone Houses of Bergen County, New Jersey, and is listed on the National Register of Historic Places, where its period of significance was given as 1800–1849. In 1861 it was listed as the residence of J.P. Blackledge, and in 1876 as that of Robert Gair.

See also
National Register of Historic Places listings in Bergen County, New Jersey

References

External links

Cresskill, New Jersey
Houses on the National Register of Historic Places in New Jersey
Houses in Bergen County, New Jersey
National Register of Historic Places in Bergen County, New Jersey
Stone houses in New Jersey
New Jersey Register of Historic Places